"Pizza Delivery" is the first segment of the fifth episode of the American animated television series SpongeBob SquarePants. It first aired on Nickelodeon in the United States on August 14, 1999. The episode was written by Sherm Cohen, Aaron Springer, and Peter Burns, and the animation was directed by Sean Dempsey. Cohen also functioned as storyboard director, and Springer worked as storyboard artist.

In the episode, the Krusty Krab receives a call from a customer ordering a pizza, and Mr. Krabs sends SpongeBob and Squidward to deliver it. When the two employees become stranded in the middle of a desert, they get into numerous predicaments. Along the way, SpongeBob tries to show Squidward the lifestyle of the pioneers.

In pitching the show to Nickelodeon, creator Stephen Hillenburg originally wanted the idea of having the characters on a road trip, inspired by the 1989 film Powwow Highway. However, he eventually gave up the idea before resurrecting it in "Pizza Delivery". The episode received critical acclaim, with most considering it one of the show's best episodes.

Plot

During closing time at the Krusty Krab, Squidward answers a last-minute phone call. While he is about to reject the order due to the restaurant being closed, Mr. Krabs accepts the order, which asks for a pizza to be delivered to the customer's house. After Squidward argues that the restaurant does not serve pizza or deliver, Mr. Krabs makes a pizza out of Krabby Patties and sends SpongeBob and Squidward to deliver it.

Squidward makes SpongeBob drive the delivery boat, despite him still being in boating school. Attempting to drive, SpongeBob sends the boat in reverse and drives it out to the desert, where it runs out of gas. The two continue their delivery on foot when SpongeBob hears a truck approaching. He attempts to get the driver's attention using a "pioneer trick," but is almost run over and rescued by Squidward. Later, they are caught in a tornado, getting sucked in due to SpongeBob's refusal to let go of the pizza. After landing, the two are unable to find the road, and SpongeBob uses another pioneer trick to find civilization by observing moss on a rock. Dismissing the tricks as nonsense, Squidward forces the group to walk in the opposite direction of the moss, unaware that SpongeBob's tip was correct.

As they continue walking, SpongeBob sings a song about the Krusty Krab pizza, annoying Squidward. When the two get hungry, Squidward tries convincing SpongeBob to give him the pizza, while SpongeBob insists that it must be delivered to the customer. While being chased by Squidward for the pizza, SpongeBob notices a giant rock, telling Squidward that they can ride it like the pioneers to the customer's house. Squidward is outraged and insists that the pioneer tips are ridiculous, while SpongeBob runs him over with the rock. 

When they arrive at the house, SpongeBob approaches the door with the pizza. The customer is upset that SpongeBob did not bring him a drink, and refuses the order. Squidward sees SpongeBob and attempts to console him, but SpongeBob collapses to the ground, sobbing. Squidward knocks on the door and angrily slams the pizza in the customer's face. He returns to SpongeBob saying that the delivery is completed, and a cheerful SpongeBob drives the rock back to the Krusty Krab, which is right across from the customer's house. The episode ends with a dismayed Squidward and a black-out.

Production
"Pizza Delivery" was written by Sherm Cohen, Aaron Springer and Peter Burns, with Sean Dempsey serving as animation director. Cohen also functioned as storyboard director, and Springer worked as storyboard artist. The episode originally aired on Nickelodeon in the United States on August 14, 1999.

Series creator Stephen Hillenburg's original idea for the series pitch was that the writers would write a storyboard for a possible episode and pitch it to Nickelodeon. Hillenburg wanted to write an episode with SpongeBob and Squidward on a road trip, inspired by the 1989 film Powwow Highway. Derek Drymon said "It's a road trip movie starring Gary Farmer, who is an innocent, kid-like character who is traveling with a curmudgeon." Eventually, the idea developed while they were working on it, but Hillenburg gave up the idea for the initial pitch. Instead, they used another idea for the pitch which was in the series pilot episode called "Help Wanted". Writers Aaron Springer and Sherm Cohen resurrected the road trip idea during the first season and used a lot of the ideas for "Pizza Delivery". This episode was also the first one written together by Springer and Cohen, and they would continue to work on episodes together until midway of the first season.

"Pizza Delivery" was released on the DVD compilation called SpongeBob SquarePants: Christmas on September 30, 2003. It was also included in SpongeBob SquarePants: The Complete 1st Season DVD released on October 28, 2003. On September 22, 2009, "Pizza Delivery" was released on the SpongeBob SquarePants: The First 100 Episodes DVD, alongside all the episodes of seasons one through five. On April 29, 2014, "Pizza Delivery" was released on the "SpongeBob, You're Fired!" episode compilation DVD.

Reception
"Pizza Delivery" received critical acclaim and is frequently cited as one of the show's best episodes. Nancy Basile of About.com ranked the episode  2 on her "Best SpongeBob SquarePants Episodes" list. She said  is the perfect episode to depict SpongeBob's enthusiasm for all things Krusty Krab against Squidward's apathy and cynical nature." Basile cited her favorite scene in the episode where "After the customer slams his door in SpongeBob's face, Squidward makes sure he swallows the pizza 'in one bite.'" Jordan Moreau, Katcy Stephan and David Viramontes of Variety ranked "Pizza Delivery" the third best episode of the show.

Giving the episode 5 out of 5 stars, Bill Treadway of DVD Verdict said the episode is his "personal favorite of all the episodes", writing that "this one is loaded with enough unique twists and hilarious comedy to bear repeat viewings."

Emily Estep of WeGotThisCovered.com ranked the episode  1 on her "Top 10 Episodes of SpongeBob SquarePants" list, saying "But – the pizza is for the customer, and flawless employee SpongeBob won't let Squidward eat any of it." She wrote "[The episode] has the undervalued nostalgia of being episode five of the entire series and it benefits from the aforementioned chemistry of Spongebob and Squidward." She also praised the episode as "an in-depth look at their [SpongeBob and Squidward] relationship, and it set the tone for just how strange the show could be." Estep lauded the hitchhiking dances by SpongeBob, saying "These moves are amusing and charming, while Squidward's bitterness is easy to relate to." In 2009, "Pizza Delivery" was chosen by viewers on Nick.com as the  1 episode during a television marathon called "The Ultimate SpongeBob SpongeBash".

In the iTunes collection, "SpongeBob SquarePants: Tom Kenny's Top 20", Tom Kenny, the voice actor for SpongeBob, lists it as among his all-time favorite episodes. He writes in the description for the episode:

References

External links

1999 American television episodes
SpongeBob SquarePants episodes
Film and television memes